This is a list of tennis players who have represented the Serbia Davis Cup team in an official Davis Cup match. Also included are those who played for the Yugoslavia Davis Cup team or the Serbia and Montenegro Davis Cup team. Serbia are considered a direct successor of both those teams and share their historical records. The player's win–loss record is their combined total, so may include matches played for Serbia while they were known as their previous names. Players are ordered by the team they debuted for.

Serbia (2007 - present)

Serbia & Montenegro (1995–2006)

SFR Yugoslavia (1927–1992)

Notes

References

Lists of Davis Cup tennis players
Davis Cup